Nataliya Vladimirovna Dmitriyeva (born 23 November 1977) is a Russian short track speed skater. She competed in three events at the 2002 Winter Olympics.

References

External links
 

1977 births
Living people
Russian female short track speed skaters
Olympic short track speed skaters of Russia
Short track speed skaters at the 2002 Winter Olympics
Sportspeople from Smolensk
21st-century Russian women